Mary Ormsby (born 1960) is a Canadian journalist and sports editor for the Toronto Star. She appears on the sports talk radio show Prime Time Sports approximately once a month as heard on the Sportsnet 590 The Fan.

Background and education
She was born in Toronto, Ontario, where she attended St. Richards Catholic Elementary School and Senator O'Connor High School.  After completing grade 12, she received a full scholarship to Ohio State University as a member of the Women's volleyball team. She was a two-time OSU Scholar-Athlete; team captain in 1979 and 1980; an all-Big Ten selection in 1980; and won three OAISW titles and the 1979 MAIAW regional championship, which was part of a school-record-setting 37-win season. She graduated with a degree in journalism and returned to her native Toronto in the early 1980s to begin a career in sports journalism with the Toronto Sun.

Career
She was subsequently hired by the Toronto Star, Canada's most widely circulated newspaper. Mary then married Paul Hunter and had four children.

In 1987, she wrote an article for the Toronto Star, entitled "It's Time for Boorish Footballers to Grow Up", exposing the sexual harassment she experienced while interviewing players in Canadian Football League locker rooms.

In 1995, she was inducted to the new Ohio State University Sports Hall of Fame.  She continues to work as an assistant sports editor at the Toronto Star, as well as a columnist at that same paper.

References

External links
 TheStar.com profile
 Ryerson Review of Journalism article

1960 births
Living people
Canadian women journalists
Canadian radio personalities
Canadian women sportswriters
Journalists from Toronto
Writers from Toronto